Raja'a Alem (born in 1970) is a Saudi Arabian novelist from Mecca/Hejaz.

Life 
Alem was born in Mecca. She received her BA in English Literature
and works as a tutor for the Center for Training Kindergarten Teachers in Jeddah, Saudi Arabia. She is an active writer of prose and her style, a blend of modern style with traditional themes, is unique among Saudi authors. Alem has published several plays, three novels, and a collection of short stories, Nahr al-Hayawan (The Animal River, 1994). She is the recipient of several prestigious international prizes.
 
Her short story "One Thousand Braids and a Governess" has been translated into English and published in "Voices of Change: short stories by Saudi Arabian women writers" edited by Abubaker Bagader, Ava M. Heinrichsdorff, Deborah Akers Her birth in Mecca and her family background is highly influential to her work and outlook. She has reflected on her relationship with the now overhauled and renovated city Mecca, saying:
 
Some of her works in Arabic have been banned. Writing in English was a significant decision for Alem. She has said: "The fact is that my people are drifting away from their own culture, and many of them no longer have a clue about what I'm writing about. So I find myself looking for new ways to communicate, for other languages, and English was the first one that came to hand...'Coming out' in another language is a way of shedding inhibitions. All the things that made me feel ashamed lost their morbid grip on me and became acceptable. I’ve never read any of my books published in Arabic; it makes me feel completely naked. Reading them in another language, though, I feel alive in a poetic way."

Among her significant work: Khatam, Sayidi Wehadana, Masra Ya Rageeb, Hubba, The Silk Road, and many more novels.

She divides her time between Jeddah and Paris.

2011 Arabic Booker Prize
Alem was announced joint winner of the 2011 Arabic Booker Prize for her novel The Doves' Necklace. She shared the prize with the Moroccan writer Mohammed Achaari.

Works 

 ثقوب في الظهر (Thouqoub fi el-dahr) Beyrouth: Dar al Adab, 2006. 
 ستر (Sitr) Beyrouth : Dar al Adab, 2006. 
 الرقص على سن الشوكة (Al-raqs ala sinn al-shouka) Beyrouth: Dar al Adab, 2006. 
 طريق الحرير (Tariq al-harir) Beyrouth : Dar al Adab, 2006. 
 خاتم (Khatim) Beyrouth : Dar al-bayda, 2006.

Venice Biennale 
In 2011, Alem represented Saudi Arabia with her sister, the artist Shadia Alem at the Venice Biennale. This was the first time that Saudi Arabia had entered the festival. Their work was entitled The Black Arch and referenced travel narratives, Hajj and the representation of women.

References 

Living people
Saudi Arabian novelists
1970 births
Women novelists
21st-century novelists
21st-century Saudi Arabian writers
21st-century Saudi Arabian women writers
International Prize for Arabic Fiction winners